The Aqueduct of Albatana (Spanish: Acueducto de Albatana) is an aqueduct located in Albatana, Spain. It was declared Bien de Interés Cultural in 1990.

See also 
 List of aqueducts

References 

Aqueducts in Spain
Bien de Interés Cultural landmarks in the Province of Albacete